Eurysthenes may refer to:
 Eurysthenes, a Heraclid, one of the two first kings of Sparta, father of the founder of the Agiad line
 Eurysthenes, one of the sons of Aegyptus killed by his wife, one of the Danaïdes
 Eurysthenes (Pergamon), a descendant of the deposed Spartan king, Demaratus
 Adhemarius eurysthenes, a species of moth